Berceanu (pronunciation: [berˈt͡ʃe̯anu]) is a Romanian surname. Notable people with the surname include:

 Gheorghe Berceanu (1949–2022), Romanian wrestler
 Radu Berceanu (born 1953), Romanian engineer and politician 

Romanian-language surnames